Horn of Plenty is a 2008 Cuban / Spanish comedy film directed by Juan Carlos Tabío.

Cast 
 Jorge Perugorría - Bernardito
 Enrique Molina - Bernardo
  - Asunción
 Yoima Valdés - Yurima
 Laura De la Uz - Zobeida
 Annia Bu Maure - Marthica 
 Tahimi Alvariño - Nadia
 Vladimir Cruz - Jacinto
  - Charo

References

External links 

2008 comedy films
2008 films
Cuban comedy films
Spanish comedy films
2000s Spanish films